Enoplognatha intrepida is a spider in the family Theridiidae ("cobweb spiders"), in the infraorder Araneomorphae ("true spiders").
The distribution range of Enoplognatha intrepida includes the USA, Canada, Greenland, and Korea.

References

External links
NCBI Taxonomy Browser, Enoplognatha intrepida

Theridiidae
Spiders described in 1898